Gaston Élie Poulain (19 July 1927 – 24 October 2015) was a Catholic bishop.

Ordained to the priesthood in 1951, Poulain was appointed coadjutor bishop of the Diocese of Périguexe, France in 1985 and then succeeded to the diocese in 1988 retiring in 2004.

Notes

1927 births
2015 deaths
20th-century Roman Catholic bishops in France
Sulpician bishops